Sewers of Oblivion is a 1980 role-playing game adventure for Tunnels & Trolls published by Flying Buffalo.

Plot summary
Sewers of Oblivion is an adventure in which a band of ruffians have taken the player character's treasure and magical artifacts and thrown the character into the sewers.

Reception
Anders Swenson reviewed Sewers of Oblivion for Different Worlds magazine and stated that "The T&T solo adventures by Flying Buffalo are generally very good and this one is no exception. Sewers of Oblivion is a good buy for the solo T&Ter."

W.G. Armintrout reviewed Sewers of Oblivion in The Space Gamer No. 51. Armintrout commented that "This is a marvelous creation, but my regular characters wouldn't touch it with a ten-foot pole. I recommend this only for those mythical people with seventh-level supermen!"

Reviews
Pegasus #1 (April/May, 1981)

References

Role-playing game supplements introduced in 1980
Tunnels & Trolls adventures